A motorized scooter is a stand-up scooter powered by either a small utility internal combustion engine or a small electric hub motor in its front and/or rear wheel. Classified as a form of micro-mobility, they are generally designed with a large center deck on which the rider stands. The first motorized scooter was manufactured by Autoped in 1915.

Recently, electric kick scooters (e-scooters) have grown in popularity with the introduction of scooter-sharing systems that use apps to allow users to rent them by the minute; such systems are commonly found in the U.S and in Queensland, Australia.

History 

 1915: Autoped introduces its stand-up scooter. Pulling back on the handlebar disengaged the clutch and applied the brake. Production continued until 1921; Krupp of Germany built the Autoped under license from 1919 to 1922.
 1986: Go-Ped introduces the first modern stand-up scooters, the Roadster and Sport.
 May 2001: Go-Ped introduces the first full-suspension stand-up e-scooter, the Hoverboard.
 2004: Evo Powerboards introduces the 2x, the first scooter with a two-speed transmission.
 November 2009: Go-Ped introduces its first completely propane-powered scooter and go-kart, the GSR Pro-Ped and GSR Pro-Quad.
 2009: Italian-Israeli designer Nimrod Ricardo Sapir designs the world's first folding e-scooter based on his patent. 
 2010: Nimrod Ricardo Sapir starts producing the world's first motorized folding e-scooter utilizing lithium-ion batteries and a brushless hub motor under the MyWay brand in Avihayil, Israel, renamed Inokim in 2013 and later moving production to Ningbo, China. 
 2013: Light electric folding scooters powered by rechargeable lithium batteries and brushless hub motors become available from Micro Mobility Systems AG.
 2018: Dockless scooter-sharing systems are rolled out in major cities, largely as expansions of bike-sharing systems.

E-scooters

Electric kick scooters have surpassed internal combustion-engined scooters in popularity since 2000. The use of an electric motor makes gears unnecessary, and may support energy recovery by regenerative braking. Range and speed vary considerably according to model.

In 2017, some bicycle-sharing companies such as Lime, and some scooter-only companies such as Bird, began offering dockless electric kick scooter sharing services. This segment of the micro-mobility market made large inroads in 2018, with numerous dockless e-scooters appearing in major cities worldwide, sometimes in controversial and contentious unsanctioned roll-outs, such as in San Francisco. Different jurisdictions have their own rules regulating electric kick scooter use on public roads and footways.

Overview

Usage 
Motorized kick scooters are used in law enforcement, security patrolling and leisure. New ride-sharing systems have made e-scooters easily accessible. They are popular in urban areas and are used as an alternative to bicycling or walking. Since this is a new way of commuting, people are still skeptical about how good it would work for them.  Ride sharing companies first started dropping these scooters off in large US cities in 2018, and the need for short distance easy access transportation in many cities has meant that they have become increasingly popular with more and more companies looking to join the market.

Environment
E-scooters, and other electric vehicles, have the potential to reduce carbon dioxide (CO2) emissions which are a cause of global warming, and other pollutants, if they are used to replace travel in vehicles with internal combustion engines. Potential environmental benefits depend upon how scooters are used: if they replace car journeys they may be beneficial, but not if they replace walked or cycled journeys. Manufacture of the batteries, in particular, requires resources, and they are often not recycled. Lime estimated that globally one in four trips on its scooters replaced a car journey. A December 2021 Swiss research paper found that privately owned e-scooters tended to replace car journeys, but rented e-scooters emitted more CO2 than the transport modes they replaced.

Safety
E-scooters are a potentially environmentally friendly alternative personal mode of transportation that has appeal in urban settings and for short distances. However, they are not exempt from the vulnerabilities users may encounter in road traffic injuries similar to exposures pedestrians and bicyclists have shared the roads. For example, Israel has seen over 120,000 imports of e-bike and e-scooters over a two-year period, but due to poor cycling infrastructure, cyclists are often forced onto pedestrian sidewalks, and pedestrians use bike lanes and thus increase the risk of traffic collision. A 2022 review of medical notes found that injury rates due to e-scooters were more like those of motorcycles than bicycles.

As availability and demand for e-scooters increases, with more powerful versions capable of reaching up to 50 miles per hour, the number of traffic accident cases has increased. Israel witnessed a six-fold increase of e-bike and e-scooter accidents over a span of three years, and China found a four-fold increase in injury rate and a six-fold increase in mortality rates. However, significant gaps remain in the knowledge about the safety measures and impact of e-scooters. A particular cause of accidents is the instability of vehicles with such small wheels when, for example, hitting a pothole. In Holland there are scooters with large wheels, like bicycles with a standing platform instead of a saddle.

As e-scooters become more popular in urban and high traffic settings, user safety poses a major concern alongside other health risks for drivers, pedestrians, cyclists and other vulnerable groups such as the elderly and children sharing the road. A study conducted in China assessed risky behaviors of e-bike, e-scooter, and bicycle riders at crossing signalized intersections and found three different types of risky behaviors including stopping beyond the stop line, riding in motor lanes, and riding against traffic.

The same study found that those riding e-scooters are more likely to engage in risky behaviors. In specific, e-scooter riders were more likely to ride in motor lanes and ride against the flow of traffic through there is high variability in the types of accidents that occur and can vary based on time of day. Understanding the health impacts of e-scooters should be considered when developing standards and policies for these new but prevalent modes of transportation. For example, policymakers should highly consider whether electric bicycles and e-scooters belong in bicycle lanes, car lanes, or on the roadways at all. Underreporting poses as additional gaps in knowledge, as minor crashes, for example, tend to be underreported and thus unaccounted for in overall e-scooter injury prevalence  and there exist gaps in research on injuries related to e-scooters. Scooter-sharing systems such as Lime or Bird include safety precautions on the scooters themselves, such as: "helmet required, license required, no riding on sidewalks, no double riding, 18+ years old". Apps used to unlock and rent the scooters will also have safety reminders and ask the riders to abide by local laws while using them. However, these recommendations are not always followed, and the difference in laws between cities and states makes regulation difficult.

A consumer association in Belgium tested e-scooters, concluding that a bicycle was preferable, citing many problems with the devices, including in particular battery failure and very poor braking in wet conditions. E-scooters were regulated as toys, without the safety considerations required for vehicles.

When electric kick scooters were introduced in Norway, the media reported a high increase in accidents, including several deaths. A study conducted by tech site Tek.no in August 2021 concluded that accidents were 5-7 times more likely on an electric kick scooter than a regular bicycle.

In Britain as of late 2021 privately owned e-scooters could not be used on public roads or footways; during a trial from mid-2020 until late 2022 rental scooters could be used on roads, but not footways, by users with an appropriate driving licence. At the time private scooters were widely used, illegally, on footways and roads. There were safety concerns—scooter accidents were causing injuries more like motorcycles than pedal cycles. Privately owned scooters were banned from carriage on London public transport after a spate of battery fires.

Regulation

Australia 

In Queensland, the laws around the use of e-scooters and other personal mobility devices are made and enforced by the state government.

While some local governments in Queensland have not allowed Lime Scooter trials, Brisbane City Council is currently undertaking a Lime Scooter trial and has invited tenders for two scooter contracts in the city.

In the ACT, the framework for personal mobility devices was amended to include e-scooters and other similar devices from 20 December 2019, permitting use on footpaths, shared paths, bicycle paths and the bicycle side of separated paths. Bicycle helmets are required to be worn.

Austria 
Electric vehicles with a power up to 600 watts and a speed up to 25 km/h are considered as bicycles.

Belgium
Belgium's traffic rules were updated on 1 June 2019 to be in line with the European Commission guidelines formed in 2016. It became legal for people over 15 years of age to ride electric motorised scooters with speed limited to 25 km/h on public roads, mirroring e-bikes. Protective gear and insurance are not required by law.

Canada 
Commuting in Canada with an e-scooter is becoming increasingly popular for those who are looking for a convenient way to get around. As power-assisted bicycles, e-scooters must follow many of the same federal laws and regulations, such as being limited to 32 km/h and not being allowed over 500 W output. Ontario has recently unveiled a series of laws aimed at ensuring safety while using electric-kick scooters or, e-scooters. The new laws require all riders to carry a valid driver’s license, and those under the age of 16 must be accompanied by an adult who also carries a valid driver’s license. Riders are now also required to wear an approved helmet when operating their e-scooter and have bright lights installed on the front and back of their vehicles.

Denmark

Since 1 January 2022, helmets are mandatory.

Finland

In Finland e-scooters have the same rules with bicycles and they do not have any age restrictions. However, all e-scooters that have a maximum speed over 25 km/h are classified as small motorcycles and require a motor insurance.

France
Those travelling at up to 25 km/h are relegated to bike lanes. The legal framework is very blurry and does not define where e-scooters may or may not be driven or parked. The Deputy Mayor of Paris Christophe Najdovski is lobbying Transport Minister Élisabeth Borne for a clearer framework that would give municipalities the power to tighten the rules on how permits are issued and how authorizations are given to deploy a fleet of e-scooters to operators.

French daily newspaper  found that in 2017, e-scooters and roller skates combined caused 284 injuries and five deaths in France, a 23 percent increase on the previous year. The perception of e-scooters is that they are fast, silent and therefore dangerous, causing many accidents, and the need to legislate is urgent.

Germany

In April 2019, the "electric propulsion vehicles without seats" and mono-wheels were added to the regulatory list of vehicles allowed to circulate in the streets. However, the list has yet to be submitted to the upper house of Parliament for entry into force.

The regulation makes a distinction between vehicles restricted to 12 km/h, authorized to users aged from 12 years up and which may circulate on footpaths, and those restricted to 20 km/h, restricted to cycle paths, users over 14 years old and with compulsory motor vehicle insurance and number plate. There is no driving license needed.
Crash accident are under-reported (74% missing) when counted as declaration to police rather than to the hospital.

The same rules for operating an automobile while intoxicated also apply to electric kick scooters.

Ireland
The use of e-scooters and mono-wheels has exploded in Irish urban areas in recent years, with estimated more than 2,000 e-scooters regularly traveling the roads of Dublin.

Under existing road traffic legislation, the use of an e-scooter on public roads is not permitted. According to the Road Traffic Act 1961, all e-scooters are considered to be "mechanically propelled vehicles". Anyone using a mechanically propelled vehicle in a public place must have insurance, road tax, and a driving license. However, it is currently not possible to tax or insure e-scooters or electric skateboards.

In March 2019, e-scooter owners started reporting that the Irish police force, the Garda Síochána, had begun regularly seizing e-scooters on the grounds that the owner did not have insurance. This was despite a Freedom of Information request detailing that the Garda website displayed incorrect information to the public, detailing that e-scooters requiring human power to start would not be considered mechanically propelled vehicles and, as such, would fall outside the remit requiring insurance. The owner groups, such as eScoot.ie, have been publicly vocal, attracting media attention and urging e-scooter owners to sign a petition for lawmakers to legalize the public use of "electric rideables" in Ireland. Under growing pressure, the Minister for Transport Shane Ross asked the Road Safety Authority to research how e-scooters are regulated in other countries, particularly other EU member states. A decision is to be taken on whether or not to amend existing legislation.
In August 2019 the Road Safety Authority submitted a report on the use of e-scooters to Ross. The report is broadly in favour of e-scooters, however a number of significant safety concerns were raised. The Minister have announced a two-month public consultation starting on 1 September 2019. The main areas of the consultation cover what personal protective equipment should be used, what training should be provided, what safety or certification standards devices should meet, what age restrictions should apply and where the devices can be used publicly.

In February 2021 Communications Minister Eamon Ryan approved draft legislation which will "regularise" e-scooters and electric bikes as commonly accepted means of transport under proposed new vehicle category, to be known as "Powered Personal Transporters" (PPTs), which will not require road tax, insurance or driving license.

Netherlands
The use of e-scooters remains illegal after a fatal electric cart incident in 2018.

New Zealand

E-scooters in New Zealand are classed as a 'Low-powered vehicle that does not require registration', provided that the output power is under 300 watts. They can therefore be ridden on footpaths, roads and separated cycleways. They cannot be ridden on paint-defined cycleways on the road. Helmets are not required, but recommended.

Norway
In Norway, e-scooters are classed as bicycles, and can therefore be ridden on footpaths, roads and separated cycleways as well as paint-defined cycleways on the road. Maximum speed is restricted to 20 km/h. Maximum weight of the e-scooter, including the battery, must not exceed 70 kg. Maximum width must not exceed 85 cm and maximum length is 120 cm.  There is no age restriction or requirement to wear a helmet.

Helmets for children up to 15 years are mandatory since spring 2022.

Blood Alcohol Concentration (BAC) is limited to 0.2 gram per liter as for car drivers.

Poland
Following a court case, a new provision of the Road Traffic Act came into force as of 21 April 2019, whereby an e-scooter falls under the definition of a moped (power up to 4 kW, max speed 45 km/h). Therefore, such vehicles are not allowed to ride on the footpaths as well as bicycle lanes. However, due to the lack of homologation, it is not possible to register an e-scooter as a road vehicle, which makes it illegal for the use on the road. The legislators are now working on changes to the law to introduce the definition of the Personal Transport Device, which would allow e-scooters to be used on footpaths and bicycle lanes.

From May 20, 2021, the regulations on the traffic of e-scooters are in force. An e-scooter is an electric powered vehicle, two-axle, with a steering wheel, without a seat and without pedals, designed to be driven only by the rider on that vehicle.

To drive an e-scooter on the road by people aged 10 to 18, it is required to have the same qualifications as for cycling, i.e. a bicycle card or driving license of categories AM, A1, B1 or T. For people over 18 years, such a document is not required.

Singapore
E-scooters in Singapore are categorized as Personal Mobility Devices (PMD), and as such, are subjected to the Land Transport Authority's regulations. All e-scooter owners are required to register their devices with the Land Transport Authority and affix the registration number on their scooter. E-scooters that are not registered by 1 July 2019 will have their devices seized by the authorities and the offender would be liable for punishment.

Retailers are allowed to sell non-compliant e-scooters however they have to indicate clearly that they can only be used on private property or for use overseas.

Unlike electric bicycles, e-scooters can only be ridden on footpaths and cycling paths. They are not allowed to be ridden on public roads.

Spain
E-scooters' recurring role in traffic accidents has led to a regulatory pushback in Spain. There have been reported 273 accidents, three of which were fatal in 2018.

The first ever person hit by e-scooter died in Spain in August 2019.

Spain is introducing technical standards and mandatory helmets.

Turkey
E-scooters can be used on cycle paths, and on urban roads without cycle paths where the speed limit is below 50 kph.

United Kingdom
Privately owned e-scooters are deemed to be Personal Light Electric Vehicles, subject to  legal requirements regarding MOT testing, tax, and licensing. In practice they cannot be made to meet the requirements for road use, and they also may not be used on footways. In some trial areas from mid-2020 to November 2022, rental e-scooters may be ridden on roads and cycle lanes but not footways; riders must be 16 or over and have a driving licence. Using a phone, driving under the influence of alcohol, and other risks, are not allowed, as for other motor vehicles. Action is not usually taken against users of private scooters on roads and footways, but in December 2021 West Midlands Police announced that they had seized and destroyed 140 e-scooters. In 2022 a woman riding a rental scooter erratically while over the legal limit for alcohol pleaded guilty to  drink-driving. She had not known that it was an offence, but was fined, and banned from driving for 18 months.

Deaths
The first UK fatality involving an e-scooter occurred on 12 July 2019 when 35-year-old Emily Hartridge was killed in Battersea, London in a collision on a roundabout with a truck. London's cycling commissioner said that "new regulations must be put forward quickly" as e-scooters are "currently not safe—with no restrictions on speeds, no mandatory brakes and lights, and no rules on who can ride them and where".

The first death of a pedestrian hit by an e-scooter occurred on 8 June 2022, when the 71-year old victim died in hospital after being impacted by a 14-year old scooter-riding male on 2 June.

United States
Rules in the United States vary by state. Motorized scooters are often not street legal, as they cannot be tagged, titled, insured, and do not meet federal requirements for lights or mirrors. Particular localities may have further ordinances that limit the use of motorized scooters. Due to their small wheels, motorized scooters are not typically safe for street use as even the smallest bumps can cause an accident.

California, for example, requires that a person riding a motorized scooter on a street be 16 years of age or older, have a valid driver's license, be wearing a bicycle helmet, have no passengers, and otherwise follow the same rules of the road the same as cars do. The motorized scooter must have brakes, may not have handlebars raised above the operator's shoulders, and if ridden at night must have a headlight, a taillight, and side reflectors. A motorized scooter may not be operated on sidewalks or on streets if the posted speed limit is over  unless in a Class II bicycle lane.

Michigan laws treat motorized scooters similarly to bicycles. They are typically allowed on sidewalks, bike lanes, and roads.

In Washington, D.C., motorized scooters are classified as Personal Mobility Devices, and are therefore not considered motor vehicles. This means there is no inspection, license, insurance, or registration required. Additionally, this means that motorized scooters are allowed on the sidewalks, and helmets are not required.

In Georgia, motorized scooters are considered Electric Personal Assistive Mobility Devices, meaning they can be used on sidewalks and highways where the speed limit is at most , or in the bike lane. The law also specifies that users of Electric Personal Assistive Mobility Devices, including motorized scooter riders, "have the same rights and duties as prescribed for pedestrians".

Scooter sharing companies have rules for operation printed on both the scooter and in the app, which includes instructions to not ride on the sidewalk. Given that the laws regarding motorized scooters vary from state to state, the scooter sharing instructions can differ from the local law.

Mechanics

Wheels and tires
Stand-up scooters may have solid tires, pneumatic tires with tubes, or tubeless pneumatic tires. There is variety within each kind; solids generally have a honeycomb structure of some sort, often surrounding a hard-plastic insert. There are some with unusually wide tires especially for off-road use. Most of them use a steel or aluminum split rim.

Drive and transmissions
The simplest drive mechanism of stand-up scooters is the electric direct drive, where the motor directly drives the rear wheel.  Some electric scooters have two motors, one for each wheel.  Brushless motors can be extremely efficient this way, especially when regenerative braking is implemented.  A large proportion of newer so-called "e-scooters" are designed this way.

When electric direct drive is not the rule, the simplest is the spindle drive, which puts an extension of the engine's output shaft, the spindle, in direct contact with the scooter's rear tire. To work correctly, the tire must have a clean, dry surface with which the spindle can effectively interact. Scooters with this type of direct transmission can be pull-started with the rear wheel off the ground, or "bump"-started by forcefully pushing them with the rear tire in contact with the ground. 

Simple chain reduction drives are also used to transfer energy to the rear wheel, generally incorporating a type of centrifugal clutch to allow the engine to idle independently.

Belt reduction drives use the combination of wide flat "cog" belts and pulleys to transfer power to the rear wheel. Like chain drives, belt drives include a centrifugal clutch, but are more susceptible to breakage in off-road conditions.

Suspension
The suspension systems of stand-up scooters range from nothing at all, to simplistic spring based fork systems, to the complicated, dampened cam-link and C.I.D.L.I (Cantilevered Independent Dynamic Linkless Indespension) suspension mechanisms or a hybrid combination of wooden deck, coil spring, and dampers.

Brakes 
Brake systems of kick scooters include disc brakes; magnetic brakes; and less efficient hydraulic brakes. Brakes can be placed on the front and/or back wheel(s). Many newer e-scooter models also have Kinetic Energy Regeneration System (KERS), which also acts as an electronic ABS system (E-ABS) on some models.

Gallery

Companies

See also 

 Scooter-sharing system
 Bicycle-sharing system
 Segway PT

References 

 
Personal transporters
Vehicles introduced in 1915